Reverse sexism is a controversial term for discrimination against men and boys or for anti-male prejudice.

Often, the debate surrounding reverse sexism involves the innate definition of sexism, for example, whether the concept of sexism itself requires systemic power, or can exist on an individual level, and whether males can experience prejudice and discrimination in a system that some would argue benefits them.

Reverse sexism has been compared by sociologists to reverse racism, and "reverse ethnocentrism," in that both can be a response to affirmative action policies that are designed to combat institutionalized sexism and racism, and are a form of backlash, through which members of majority categories (e.g., men, whites, or Anglos) assert that they are being discriminated against. In more rigid forms, this stance assumes that the historic imbalance in favor of men in the contemporary era is no longer applicable, or that women are now viewed as the superior gender or sex.
Feminist theorist Florence Rush characterizes the idea of reverse sexism specifically as a misogynist reaction to feminism; men's rights activists such as Warren Farrell promote the idea of reverse sexism to argue that the feminist movement has rearranged society in such a way that it now benefits women and harms men.

History 
The concept of reverse sexism was first documented during the 1960s at the same time as the emergence of the women's liberation and feminist movements. A men's liberation movement was formed, led by psychologists who argued that femininity and masculinity were socially formed behaviors and not the result of genes. The men's liberation movement tried to balance the two ideas that men were responsible for oppressing women, but also being oppressed themselves by strict gender roles.
In the mid-1970s, the movement began to focus on the oppression of men and less on the effects of sexism on women. This shift was influenced by author Warren Farrell, who wrote The Myth of Male Power. He emphasized how male gender roles disadvantaged men by forbidding them from being seen as caring or having emotion.

In the 1980s, a new men's rights movement began to form which focused only on the ways that sex roles discriminated against males rather than the oppression it inflicted on both genders. Author Herb Goldberg claimed that the U.S. was a "matriarchal society" because women have the power to transgress gender roles and assume masculine and feminine roles, while males are still constrained to the purely masculine role.
Reneé Blank and Sandra Slipp in 1994 compiled the testimonies of men who believed they were discriminated against based on their sex and race. This occurred in a time where women were entering the work force and obtaining managerial positions.

In the preamble to a study on internalized sexism, Steve Bearman, Neill Korobov and Avril Thorne stated that reverse sexism was not a "meaningful phrase", because "while individual women or women as a whole may enact prejudicial biases towards specific men or toward men as a group, this is done without the backing of a societal system of institutional power".
The same year, two assistant professors, Özlem Sensoy and Robin DiAngelo, wrote in an open letter to their faculty that reverse sexism does not exist, because the word "sexism" refers to "power relations that are historic and embedded, and these relations do not flip back and forth" and because "the same groups who have historically held systemic power in the US and Canada continue to do so".

Philosopher David Benatar's 2012 book, Second Sexism: Discrimination Against Men and Boys, expounded the theory that discrimination against males is often unnoticed and considered less important than discrimination against females.

See also 
Reverse discrimination
Reverse racism
Third wave feminism
Misandry

References

Sexism
Misandry
Masculism